Harvey Bell "Harve" Thorn, Sr. (August 28, 1885 – October 1962) was an American politician. He was a member of the Arkansas House of Representatives, serving from 1931 to 1936. He was a member of the Democratic party.

References

1962 deaths
1885 births
20th-century American politicians
People from Harrisburg, Arkansas
Speakers of the Arkansas House of Representatives
Democratic Party members of the Arkansas House of Representatives